The Boxing Day Test match is a cricket Test match held in Melbourne, Victoria, Australia, involving the Australian cricket team and an opposing national team that is touring Australia during the southern summer. It begins annually on Boxing Day (26 December) and is played at the Melbourne Cricket Ground (MCG).

History

By long tradition, a Sheffield Shield match between Victoria and New South Wales had been played at the MCG over the Christmas period dating back as far as 1865.  It included Boxing Day as one of the scheduled days of play, much to the chagrin of the NSW players who missed spending Christmas with their families as a result. The Melbourne Test was usually held over the New Year period, often starting on 1 January.

During the 1950–51 Ashes series, the Melbourne Test was played from 22 to 27 December, with the fourth day's play being on Boxing Day, but no test matches were played on Boxing Day in Melbourne between 1953 and 1967. Because there were six Tests in the 1974–75 Ashes series, in order to fit them all in to the overall schedule, the Third Test at Melbourne was scheduled to start on Boxing Day. That was the origin of the modern tradition, although it was not until 1980 that the Melbourne Cricket Club and the Australian cricket team secured the rights to begin a Test match annually on Boxing Day at the MCG.

The Boxing Day Test has cultural significance, often drawing large crowds, being a tradition for some to attend each year. During the match, crowd activities include waves, chanting (often with trumpets or drums), and beer cup snakes/stacking.

Individual awards 

In December 2019, Cricket Australia announced plans for a medal to be awarded to the best player of the Boxing Day Test match from 2020, named in honour of Indigenous Australian cricketer Johnny Mullagh.

List of Boxing Day Test matches

See also
 Mullagh Medal

Notes

References

External links
  History of MCG Boxing Day Tests
 Scoreboard: 1950 Boxing Day Test
 Scoreboard: 1952 Boxing Day Test
 Scoreboard: 1968 Boxing Day Test
 Scoreboard: 1974 Boxing Day Test
 Scoreboard: 1975 Boxing Day Test
 Scoreboard: 1980 Boxing Day Test

Australia in international cricket
Test cricket
Recurring sporting events established in 1950
Sports competitions in Melbourne
1950 establishments in Australia
December sporting events
January sporting events
Christmas traditions
Boxing Day